The 2018 Wake Forest Demon Deacons men's soccer team represented Wake Forest University during the 2018 NCAA Division I men's soccer season. It was the 72nd season of the university fielding a program. It was the program's fourth season with Bobby Muuss as head coach. The Demon Deacons played their home matches at Spry Stadium.

Background

The 2017 Wake Forest men's soccer team finished the season with a 19–2–2 overall record and a 7–0–1 ACC record.  The Demon Deacons were seeded first–overall in the 2017 ACC Men's Soccer Tournament, and they went on to win the tournament.  The Demon Deacons earned an automatic bid into the 2017 NCAA Division I Men's Soccer Tournament for winning the ACC Tournament.  As the first–overall seed in the tournament, Wake Forest defeated Columbia and Butler, before losing to eventual champions Stanford in the Quarterfinals.

At the end of the season, three Demon Deacons men's soccer players were selected in the 2018 MLS SuperDraft: Jon Bakero, Ema Twumasi and Luis Argudo.  Bakero and Twumasi were both taken in the first round.

Player movement

Players leaving

Players arriving

Squad

Roster 

Updated:August 3, 2018

Team management

Source:

Schedule

Source:

|-
!colspan=8 style=""| Exhibition

|-
!colspan=7 style=""| Regular season

|-
!colspan=6 style=""| ACC Tournament

|-
!colspan=6 style=""| NCAA Tournament

Awards and honors

2019 MLS Super Draft

Sources:

Rankings

References

Wake Forest Demon Deacons men's soccer seasons
Wake Forest Demon Deacons
Wake Forest Demon Deacons, Soccer
Wake Forest Demon Deacons
Wake Forest